Juan Gargurevich (born 1934 in Mollendo, Peru) is a Peruvian journalist. He is the foremost historian of communication media in Peru.

References

Peruvian journalists
Male journalists
Peruvian male writers
1934 births
Living people
Peruvian people of Croatian descent
Academic staff of the National University of San Marcos
Date of birth missing (living people)
20th-century Peruvian writers